Shilparamam is an arts and crafts village located in Madhapur, Hyderabad, Telangana, India.

The village was conceived with an idea to create an environment for the preservation of traditional crafts. There are ethnic festivals round the year.

Shilparamam, a crafts village, conceived in the year 1992, is situated just about few kilometers from Hyderabad city. For promotion and preservation of Indian arts and crafts and to motivate the artisans, the state government established this platform.

Attractions at Shilparamam

Rural Museum 

The rural museum, surrounded by trees, is a miniature depiction of typical Indian village.
Over 15 life-sized huts, authentically constructed out of baked clay and thatch, depict rural and tribal lifestyles and the life of various artisans. It provides a window to rural life for city dwellers and those who have never visited a village before. The museum houses sculptures and life size models depicting the day-to-day activities of the rural artisans.

Rock Museum 

Shantiniketan's Subrata Basu has fashioned a rock garden here by blending his own rock collections with the rock formations found in the village. The natural formations stand unswayed in a scenic form in Rock Museum.[tone] This Rock Museum adds a fantastic ecological side to Shilparamam.

Photo gallery

References

External links

Official site
Mini Shilparamam Uppal Official site

Tourist attractions in Hyderabad, India
Buildings and structures in Hyderabad, India
Indian handicrafts